Tolapai is the code name of Intel's embedded system on a chip (SoC) which combines a Pentium M (Dothan) processor core, DDR2 memory controllers and input/output (I/O) controllers, and a QuickAssist integrated accelerator unit for security functions.

Overview 
The Tolapai embedded processor has 148 million transistors on a 90 nm process technology, 1088-ball FCBGA with a 1.092mm pitch, and comes in a 37.5mm × 37.5mm package. It is also Intel's first integrated x86 processor, chipset and memory controller since 1994's 80386EX.

Intel EP80579 integrated processor for embedded computing:
 CPU: Pentium M clocked from between 600 MHz and 1.2 GHz
 Cache: 256 KB
 Package: 1088-ball flip chip BGA
 Memory: DDR2 from 400- to 800 MHz; MCH supports DIMM or memory down with optional 32-/64-bit and ECC configurations
 Bus: One local expansion bus for general control or expanded peripheral connections
 PCI Express: PCIe root complex interface in 1 ×8, 2 ×4, or 2 ×1 configurations
 Storage: 2× SATA (Gen1 or Gen2) interfaces
 Networking: 3× 10/100/1000 Ethernet MACs supporting reduced gigabit media-independent interface (RGMII) or reduced media-independent interface (RMII), and Management Data Input/Output (MDIO)
 USB: 2× Universal Serial Bus (1.1 or 2.0) interfaces
 GPIO: 36× General Purpose Input/Output ports
 CAN: 2× Controller Area Network (CAN bus) 2.0b interfaces
 High Speed Serial (HSS): 3× ports for T1/E1 or FXS/FXO connections
 Serial: 1× Synchronous Serial Port (SSP)
 Universal asynchronous receiver-transmitters (UARTs): 2× 16550 UART-compatible
 SMB: 2× System Management Bus (SMBus) interfaces
 LPC: 1× Low Pin Count (LPC 1.1) interface
 SPI: 1× Serial Peripheral Interface Bus (SPI) boot interface
 RTC: Integrated real-time clock (RTC) support
 EDMA: Enhanced DMA (EDMA) engine with low latency memory transfers; supports multiple peer-to-peer configurations
 Operating temperature: 0 to 70 degrees C (most models); −40 to 85 degrees C (some models)

List of Intel 80579 processors 
 All models support: MMX, Streaming SIMD Extensions (SSE), SSE2, SSE3, XD bit (an NX bit implementation)
 Die size: 225 mm²
 Steppings: B1

See also
Atom (system on chip)
Intel Quark

References

External links 
 Intel Introduces Future VPN Solution: Tolapai
 Ars Technica: Intel Confirms details of Tolapai, a SoC embedded processor
 Cnet News: Live from Hot Chips 19: Session 7, Networking 
 Intel QuickAssist Acceleration Technology for Embedded Systems
 Embedded Intel EP80579 Integrated Processor

Intel products
Intel x86 microprocessors